Sophia Chang (born 1965) a music director, producer, manager, and author. Widely recognized as the first Asian woman in hip hop, Chang managed A Tribe Called Quest, Raphael Saadiq, Q-Tip, and members of Wu-Tang Clan such as RZA, GZA, and Ol' Dirty Bastard. Chang produced Project Runway All Stars (season 1). Her memoir, The Baddest Bitch in the Room, won the Wavy 2021 Best Book Award. Chang is currently a screenwriter, author and TV producer developing numerous projects, including a scripted series based on her memoir.

Personal life 
Sophia Chang was born in Vancouver, Canada to two Korean parents in 1965. Her father was a mathematician. She has one older brother, Heesok. She has two children with Shi Yan Ming. Chang and Shi Yan Ming divorced in 2007.

Education 
Chang received her Bachelor of Arts at the University of British Columbia in French literature.

Career 
After graduating from the University of British Columbia, Sophia Chang moved to New York City to start her career in the music industry in the late 1980s. She worked with Paul Simon in the early days of her career. She then worked at Jive Records where she first met RZA. While at Jive, Chang signed Fu-Schnickens, members of Hieroglyphics, Souls of Mischief, and worked with artists A Tribe Called Quest, UGK, and E-40. She later became the manager of RZA’s label Razor Sharp Records. At Razor Sharp, Chang worked with Ghostface Killah for his debut album, Ironman.

From 1995 to 2007, Chang was the manager of the USA Shaolin Temple in New York City and her then-partner Shi Yan Ming.

Chang produced season 1 of Project Runway All Stars from 2012 to 2013.

In September 2020, Chang published her memoir, The Baddest Bitch in the Room, which was released in print and by Audible in partnership with Reese Witherspoon’s media brand, Hello Sunshine. She also launched the Unlock Her Potential mentorship program for Women of color in September 2020. In just the first two years of the program, Chang recruited mentors who are well-established in the entertainment industry, such as Mona Scott-Young, Andre Royo, RZA, Jim Jarmusch, Bao Nguyen, 9th Wonder, Joey Bada$$, Ebro Darden, Michael Mann, W. Kamau Bell and Pamela Adlon.

In light of her evolving career from behind the scenes towards the spotlight, Chang has shared her story and was featured in media outlets such as Breakfast Club Power 105.1 FM, Defining Moments with OZY - A Hulu Original Documentary, the TODAY show, NPR’s Microphone Check, Essence, Complex, The Root, and more.

Awards 
Chang's memoir The Baddest Bitch in the Room won the Wavy 2021 Best Book Award.

Resources

External links 
Interview with Cecily Lo for Interview Magazine.
Interview with Dimas Sanfiorenzo for Okayplayer.
Sophia Chang's Official Website

1965 births
Canadian music managers
Canadian memoirists
Canadian record producers
Canadian people of Korean descent
Wu-Tang Clan affiliates
Canadian women memoirists
Talent managers
Living people
University of British Columbia alumni